Halcyon Days: Interviews with Classic Computer and Video Game Programmers is a digital book edited by James Hague and published in 1997. The book was originally formatted using HTML and sold via mail-order, shipped on a floppy disk by Dadgum Games for USD$20.  In 2002, Halcyon Days was made freely available on the web.  The book continued to be sold by Dr. Dobb's Journal, on a CD-ROM also containing Susan Lammers's Programmers at Work, until Dr. Dobb's shut down at the end of 2014.

The introduction to Halcyon Days is written by John Romero who told Wired News the interviews were "like hearing messages from old gods."

Halcyon Days has since become a common reference for writings on game history, including Racing the Beam (MIT Press, 2009), and Retrogame Archeology (Springer, 2016).

Interviewees
 Ed Averett: Magnavox Odyssey² games
 Danielle Bunten Berry: M.U.L.E., The Seven Cities of Gold
 Stephen C. Biggs
 Adam Billyard
 Bill Budge: Raster Blaster, Pinball Construction Set
 Chris Crawford: Eastern Front, Legionnaire
 Steve DeFrisco
 David Fox: Rescue on Fractalus!
 Jon Freeman & Anne Westfall
 Gary Gilbertson
 Marc Goodman: The Bilestoad
 Dan Gorlin: Choplifter
 Tom Griner
 Steve Hales: Fort Apocalypse
 John Harris
 Eugene Jarvis
 David Lubar
 Scott Ludwig
 Archer Maclean
 Jeff Minter
 Brian Moriarty
 Doug Neubauer: Star Raiders, Solaris
 Philip Price
 Warren Robinett: Adventure
 Ed Rotberg: Battlezone, Blasteroids, S.T.U.N. Runner
 Warren Schwader: Sammy Lightfoot
 Paul Shirley: Spindizzy
 Tim Skelly

See also
Coders at Work

References

External links 
 Official website

Books about video games
1997 non-fiction books
Ebooks
Video game culture
Video game design